Propellant 23 may refer to:

 Fluoroform
Propellant 23 (The Avengers)